Kynoch was a British manufacturer of ammunition.

Kynoch may also refer to:

 Kynoch (surname)
 Kynoch, Ontario, Canada
 Kynoch Park, a football ground in Keith, Scotland
 Kynoch Press, English press in Witton, Birmingham